Linden Lin or Lin Tsai-chueh (born 16 June 1951) is a Taiwanese publisher. He is the publisher and editorial director of Linking Publishing Company and former chairman of the Taipei International Book Exhibition (TIBE). Lin was awarded the Ordre des Arts et des Lettres (Chevalier) of France in 2011, for his contributions to the promotion of French literature and culture in Taiwan.

References

External links
Linking Publishing Company

1951 births
Living people
Taiwanese publishers (people)
Chevaliers of the Ordre des Arts et des Lettres